Charles Edward "Carlos" Fisher (born February 22, 1983) is an American former professional baseball pitcher. He has played in Major League Baseball (MLB) for the Cincinnati Reds.

Early life
Fisher graduated from Duarte High School (Duarte, California) in 2001. He attended Citrus Community College in Glendora, California before attending Lewis-Clark State College in Lewiston, Idaho.

Professional career

Cincinnati Reds
The Cincinnati Reds drafted Carlos Fisher in the 11th round of the 2005 First-Year Player Draft. He was signed by scout Howard Bowens.

Fisher started his career as a starting pitcher with the Billings Mustangs rookie class team in 2005, where he went 4-4 with a 4.19 ERA. He was Pioneer League Pitcher of the Week on 6/26.

He played 2006 for the class-A Dayton Dragons. He 12-5 with a 2.76 ERA in 150 innings. Fisher was Midwest League Pitcher of the Week on 4/23.

Carlos pitched seven games for the Sarasota Reds in 2007, going 4-1 with a 2.20 ERA. He was Florida State League Pitcher of the Week on 4/16. The Reds promoted him to Chattanooga, their double-A team, and he 5-9 with a 4.29 ERA. Fisher was Southern League Pitcher of the Week on 7/23. He was named to the mid-season All-Star teams for the FSL, Southern League, and Texas League in 2007.

Fisher was converted to a reliever in 2008. He started the year with Chattanooga. He went 1-5 with a 3.73 ERA in 36 games, along with 8 saves. He was then promoted to the triple-A Louisville Bats. In 14 games, he was 5-0 with a 1.04 ERA. Fisher participated in the 2008 Arizona Fall League as a member of the Peoria Javelinas. He pitched in 10 games (10.0 innings), struck out 10 batters and notched three saves, but was 0-1 with a 10.80 ERA. He was added to the Reds' 40-man roster on November 20.

He started the 2009 season with Louisville. In 18 innings, he was 2-0 with a 2.00 ERA. The Reds recalled him on May 22.

On May 24, 2009, Carlos Fisher made his Major League debut in the eleventh inning of a 3-3 game against the Cleveland Indians. In his first Major League appearance, Fisher pitched one scoreless inning and earned the win after Alex Gonzalez hit a walk-off RBI double in the bottom of the inning. The win made him the first Reds pitcher to earn a win his debut since Héctor Carrasco did on April 4, 1994. He got his first big league strikeout against the first batter he faced (Kelly Shoppach). Fisher spent the rest of the season with the Reds until being optioned to Sarasota between games of a doubleheader on August 31. He pitched two scoreless innings in two games for the single-A Reds before being recalled again as a September call-up. He finished the season with the Reds, and his 2009 MLB totals were 1-1, 4.47 ERA, 52.1 innings pitched, 48 K and 31 BB.

Fisher split the 2010 season with the Reds and the Bats. He started the season with Louisville, but was called up to replace Logan Ondrusek. He was sent down and called up a few more times, including being called up in favor of Aroldis Chapman when Russ Springer went on the DL. He went 1-1 with a 2.23 ERA for Louisville in 30 games. In 18 games for the Reds he went 1-1 with a 5.64 ERA. Fisher was left off the Reds post-season roster.

Fisher spent 2011 split between the Reds and the Bats yet again. Fisher went 4 and 1 in AAA with an ERA of 3.35 in 40.1 innings of work. With the Reds he went 0 and 3 with an ERA of 4.50 in 24 innings of work. One of his losses in the majors in 2011 was a 19 inning game that he gave up the walk-off hit. The winner in this game was the Phillies starting 2nd baseman that day Wilson Valdez. This was the first time a player started the game in the field and won the game on the mound since Babe Ruth.

Fisher was removed from the Reds 40 man roster prior to 2012 season to make space for Ryan Madson.

Oakland Athletics/Tampa Bay Rays
Fisher played in the Oakland Athletics and Tampa Bay Rays organizations in 2013.

Somerset Patriots
He started 2014 with the Somerset Patriots of the Atlantic League of Professional Baseball.

Atlanta Braves
He had his contract purchased by the Atlanta Braves on June 21, 2014. The Braves assigned Fisher to the Triple A Gwinnett Braves, where he spent the remainder of the 2014 season. Fisher started the 2015 season with Gwinnett as well. He elected free agency on November 6, 2015.

Texas Rangers
On February 2, 2016, Fisher signed a minor league contract with the Texas Rangers.

San Diego Padres
During the 2016 offseason, Fisher signed a minor league contract with the San Diego Padres.

Mexican League (2017–2018)
On June 6, 2017, Fisher was loaned to the Toros de Tijuana of the Mexican Baseball League. On March 18, 2018, Fisher was traded to the Rieleros de Aguascalientes. On July 3, 2018, he was traded to the Acereros de Monclova. He became a free agent after the season.

References

External links
, or MiLB.com, or Retrosheet, or Pura Pelota

1983 births
Living people
Acereros de Monclova players
American baseball players of Mexican descent
American expatriate baseball players in Mexico
Baseball players from California
Billings Mustangs players
Cañeros de Los Mochis players
Caribes de Anzoátegui players
Chattanooga Lookouts players
Cincinnati Reds players
Dayton Dragons players
El Paso Chihuahuas players
Gwinnett Braves players
Leones del Escogido players
American expatriate baseball players in the Dominican Republic
Lewis–Clark State Warriors baseball players
Louisville Bats players
Major League Baseball pitchers
Mexican League baseball pitchers
Midland RockHounds players
Montgomery Biscuits players
Sportspeople from West Covina, California
Peoria Javelinas players
Rieleros de Aguascalientes players
Round Rock Express players
Sarasota Reds players
Somerset Patriots players
Toros de Tijuana players
Yaquis de Obregón players
2017 World Baseball Classic players
American expatriate baseball players in Venezuela
Alaska Goldpanners of Fairbanks players